William Pommer may refer to:
 William Henry Pommer, American composer
 William Albert Pommer, member of the House of Commons of Canada